St Helens power station supplied electricity to the Borough of St Helens and the surrounding area from 1896 to the late 1960s. The power station was developed by the St Helens Corporation which operated it up to the nationalisation of the British electricity supply industry in 1948. It was redeveloped several times to meet the increased demand for electricity.

History
St Helens Corporation applied in 1894 for a Provisional Order under the Electric Lighting Acts to generate and supply electricity to Borough of St Helens. An Order was granted by the Board of Trade and was confirmed by Parliament through the Electric Lighting Orders Confirmation (No. 1) Act 1894 (57 & 58 Vict. c. xlix). A power station was built in Warrington Road, St Helens and was commissioned in October 1896. The Corporation charged 6d./kWh and attracted just 63 customers in its first year of operation.

In 1897 the Corporation assumed control of St Helens Tramways which it intended to redevelop using electric traction instead of steam power. The Corporation applied for a further Provisional Order in 1900. This was granted and confirmed by Parliament through the Electric Lighting Orders Confirmation (No. 5) Act 1900 (63 & 64 Vict. c. xlix). A new power station built at Croppers Hill, St Helens (53°27’02”N, 2°44’54”W).

The generating station was extended with new plant as demand for electricity grew. In 1911 a 1,500 kW turbo-alternator and condenser were installed costing £5,000. In 1912 a 2,000 kW 6 kW turbo-alternator and associated boilers were installed.

During the general strike in 1926 the local Civil Commissions overruled the St Helen Labour Council and allowed staff to continue to run the power station against the Council’s wishes.

The tram system was decommissioned on 31 March 1936.

The British electricity supply industry was nationalised in 1948 under the provisions of the Electricity Act 1947 (10 & 11 Geo. 6 c. 54). The St Helens electricity undertaking was abolished, ownership of St Helens power station was vested in the British Electricity Authority, and subsequently the Central Electricity Authority and the Central Electricity Generating Board (CEGB). At the same time the electricity distribution and sales responsibilities of the St Helens electricity undertaking were transferred to the Merseyside and North Wales Electricity Board (MANWEB)

Following nationalisation St Helens power station became part of the St Helens electricity supply district.

The power station was converted to oil firing in 1963.

St Helens power station was closed in the late 1960s.

Equipment specification
The plant in the original power station was rated at 145 kW and comprised Robey horizontal engines coupled directly to alternators.

Plant in 1923
By 1923 the plant comprised boilers delivering 161,000 lb/h (20.3 kg/s) of steam to:

 1 × 1,000 kW steam turbo-alternator alternating current (AC)
 1 × 2,000 kW Dick, Kerr and Company steam turbo-alternator AC
 1 × 3,000 kW steam turbo-alternator AC
 1 × 5,000 kW steam turbo-alternator AC
 1 × 200 kW reciprocating engine with direct current (DC) generator
 2 × 300 kW reciprocating engines with DC generators

These machines had a total generating capacity of 11,800 kW comprising 11,000 kW of alternating current (AC) plus 800 kW of direct current (DC) plant.

The following electricity supplies were available to consumers:

 400 & 230 Volts, 3-phase, 50 Hz AC
 460 & 230 Volts, DC
 500 Volts DC, traction current

Plant in 1954
By 1954 the plant comprised:

 Boilers:
 5 × Babcock & Wilcox 38,000 lb/h (4.79 kg/s) chain grate stoker boilers (total evaporative capacity 190,000 lb/h (23.9 kg/s)), steam conditions were 265 psi and 750°F (18.3 bar and 399°C), steam was supplied to:
 Generators:
 1 × 5.0 MW Oerlikon turbo-alternator
 1 × 6.5 MW Brush Ljungstrom turbo-alternator
 1 × 12.5 MW Metropolitan Vickers turbo-alternator

The total generating capacity was 24 MW at 6.6 kV.

Condenser water was cooled in six wooden cooling towers with a total capacity of 1.11 million gallons per hour (1.40 m3/s).

Operations

Operating data 1921–23
The electricity supply data for the period 1921–23 was:

Electricity Loads on the system were:

Revenue from the sale of current (in 1923) was £76,375; the surplus of revenue over expenses was £30,894.

Operating data 1946
In 1946 St Helens power station supplied 35,491 MWh of electricity; the maximum output load was 19,486 kW. The load factor was 20.8 %, and the thermal efficiency was 14.13 %.

Operating data 1954–67
Operating data for the period 1954–67 was:

St Helens Electricity District
Following nationalisation in 1948 St Helens power station became part of the St Helens electricity supply district, covering 36 square miles (93.2 km2) with a population of 131,000 in 1958. The number of consumers and electricity sold in the St Helens district was:

In 1958 the number of units sold to categories of consumers was:

The maximum demand on the system was 93,000 kW, the load factor was 50.9 %.

See also
 Timeline of the UK electricity supply industry
 List of power stations in England
 St Helens Corporation Tramways
 Bold power station

References

Demolished power stations in the United Kingdom
Coal-fired power stations in England